Anthony Bate (31 August 1927 – 19 June 2012) was an English actor.

He is possibly best known for his role as Oliver Lacon in the BBC television adaptations of the John le Carré novels Tinker Tailor Soldier Spy and Smiley's People and his role as Bret Renssalaer in Len Deighton's trilogy Game, Set and Match.Gideons Way

Bate's other credits include: Dixon of Dock Green, The Saint, The Avengers, Prime Suspect, Inspector Morse, A Touch of Frost and Midsomer Murders.

Early life
Bate was born the third son of Isle of Wight hoteliers Hubert George Cookson Bate (son of George Harry Bate, a hairdresser and trichologist, of Stourbridge; died 1986) and Cecile Marjorie Canadine (died 1973). Bate was educated at King Edward VI School, Stourbridge, and trained at the Central School of Speech and Drama (gold medal). During his National Service he served with the Royal Navy Volunteer Reserve from 1945 to 1947.

Theatre
From his professional theatre debut in 1953, Bate's theatre roles included: his first West End appearance in Inherit the Wind (St Martin's) 1960, Treasure Island (Mermaid) 1960, Happy Family (Hampstead) 1966, Much Ado About Nothing and Silence (RSC Aldwych) 1969. Find Your Way Home (Open Space Theatre) 1970, Eden End (tour) 1972, Economic Necessity (Haymarket Leicester) 1973, Getting Away with Murder (Comedy) 1976, Shadow Box (Cambridge) 1979, The Old Jest (tour) 1980, and A Flea in her Ear (Plymouth Theatre Co) 1980. Little Lies (Wyndhams) 1983, Master Class (tour) 1984, The Deep Blue Sea (Theatre Royal Haymarket) 1988, Relative Values (Chichester Festival Theatre and Savoy) 1993–94.

Television
Bate's first television appearance was in 1955 and from then on he appeared as: James in Pinter's The Collection, Rogojin in The Idiot, MacDuff in Macbeth, Javert in Les Misérables, the title role in Grady (a trilogy), T H Huxley in Darwin’s Bulldog, Nikolai in Fathers and Sons, Creon in King Oedipus, Victor Hugo in Ego Hugo, Harry Paynter in Intimate Strangers, The Dutch Train Hijack 1976, Dr Dorn in The Seagull 1977, Kim Philby in Philby, Burgess and Maclean 1977 (nominated Best Actor Monte Carlo Festival 1978), An Englishman's Castle (1978), the title role in The Trial of Uri Urlov 1978, Tinker Tailor Soldier Spy 1978, Crime and Punishment 1979, Tis Pity She's A Whore 1980, The Human Crocodile 1980, “Fanny by Gaslight” 1981, Smiley's People 1982, A Woman Called Golda (with Ingrid Bergman) 1982, J A D Ingres in Artists and Models 1983, Shackleton, Game, Set and Match (TV mini series 1988), War and Remembrance 1988,  Inspector Morse  (Dr Crowther in Last Bus to Woodstock) 1988, Countdown to War 1989, Agatha Christie's Poirot 1990, Medics 1991 and 1992, Prime Suspect 1994, Rebecca 1996, A Touch of Frost 1996, Bodyguards 1996, Silent Witness 1997, Midsomer Murders 2000. He also appeared in Spindoe and Beasts.

Films
Bate's film credits include Dentist in the Chair (1960), Dentist on the Job (1961), Payroll (1961), A Prize of Arms (1962), Act of Murder (1964), Ghost Story (1974), Give My Regards to Broad Street (1984), Eminent Domain (1990) and Nowhere in Africa (2001) (winner Oscar for Best Film in a Foreign Language). He was a member of BAFTA from 1985.

Personal life
On 22 May 1954, he married Diana Fay, the daughter of Kenneth Alfred Charles Caws Watson (d. 29 October 1940), of Seaview, Isle of Wight. His two sons are Gavin Watson (born 1961) and Mark Hewitt (born 1963).

Death
Bate died at St. Mary's Hospital, Isle of Wight, on 19 June 2012 at the age of 84, after a brief illness. He had been rushed into the hospital on 17 June because of his condition. He was survived by his wife Diana and his two children.

References

External links
 

1927 births
2012 deaths
English male stage actors
English male television actors
Alumni of the Royal Central School of Speech and Drama
People from Stourbridge
People educated at King Edward VI College, Stourbridge